The Jaroslav Jandourek Cup is the national ice hockey cup located in Bosnia and Herzegovina. It has been held since 2010, and is named after the HK Bosna coach, Jaroslav Jandourek.

Champions
2010: HK Bosna
2011: HK Ilidža 2010
2012: HK Alfa

References

External links
Cup on eurohockey.com

Ice hockey competitions in Bosnia and Herzegovina
Bos